Social Impact Media Awards was renamed SIMA Studios in 2018. SIMA Studios is a non-profit impact media agency which curates and distributes documentaries and creative media projects.  In 2012, Daniela Kon founded SIMA Studios to support social impact filmmaking by launching an annual awards program, SIMA Awards, and global distribution platforms, SIMA X and SIMA Classroom. In 2018, SIMA Studios launched its Fiscal Sponsorship program to support international media projects that inspire social change.

Programs 
SIMA Studios hosts three programs

SIMA Awards

SIMA Awards started as the first and only international media competition honoring achievements in the creative, human rights, and humanitarian fields  and its mission consists in promoting and exhibiting the work of independent filmmakers, activists, and change-makers that may otherwise have been overlooked.

The awards are hosted online. Films are selected for the following categories: Documentary Features, Documentary Shorts, Virtual Reality/360 Video, and Impact Video. Additional jury prizes are awarded to projects that reflect a core principle of SIMA's mission. The 2018 jury prizes included: Ethos, Stylistic Achievement, Lens to Action, and Transparency.

SIMA X

SIMA X is a year-round community screening program which makes SIMA Studios' catalog of films available to grassroots activists, organizations and festivals across 26 countries.

Every year, SIMA Studios selects SIMA Award winning films to join its screening collection. SIMA screening events have been co-hosted by Human Rights Watch, Impact Hub (Global Network), Bay Street Film Festival, Skirball Cultural Center and UN Women.

SIMA Classroom

SIMA Classroom is a streaming platform that gives access to award-winning short documentaries experiences and virtual reality experiences for the purposes of cultivating global citizenship through education. Films on the SIMA Classroom platform cover topics such as climate change, gender inequality, and conservation. The platform includes lesson plans, playlists, and a variety of teaching aids for educators at schools, colleges, foundations, and libraries in both formal and informal education spaces around the world. It is currently in use by 1,400 teachers and 36,000 students. The program has collaborated with organizations like Skirball Cultural Center to screen films for high school students.

Fiscal Sponsorship 
SIMA Studios has a Fiscal Sponsorship program that enables creative impact projects to raise tax-deductible funds in the US, in all stages of development, production, post-production, distribution, outreach and impact campaigns.

References 

Internet film festivals
Film awards
Mass media agency
Film distributors
Social impact